This page describes the qualifying round for the Eurocup Basketball 2011–12.

The qualifying round consisted of one round, played in home and away series.

Teams

Matches
|}

First leg

Second leg

Azovmash won 153–140 on aggregate

Spartak Saint Petersburg won 143–123 on aggregate

Dexia Mons-Hainaut won 144–141 on aggregate

Cedevita Zagreb won 157–147 on aggregate

Le Mans won 160–151 on aggregate

Gran Canaria won 153–121 on aggregate

Lukoil Academic won 157–142 on aggregate

Telenet BC Oostende won 158–129 on aggregate

External links
EuroCup Official Website

2011–12 Eurocup Basketball